This is a list of law enforcement agencies in the state of Vermont.

According to the US Bureau of Justice Statistics' 2008 Census of State and Local Law Enforcement Agencies, the state had 69 law enforcement agencies employing 1,103 sworn police officers, about 178 for each 100,000 residents.

State agencies 
 Vermont Capitol Police
 Vermont Department of Public Safety
 Vermont State Police
 Vermont Fish and Wildlife Department
 Division of Warden Service
 Vermont Department of Corrections
 Vermont Department of Liquor and Lottery
 Division of Liquor Control
 Vermont Secretary of State
 Office of Professional Regulation
 Investigative Unit
 Vermont Department of Motor Vehicles
 Enforcement and Safety Division
 Office of the Vermont Attorney General

County agencies 

 Addison County Sheriff's Office
 Bennington County Sheriff's Department
 Caledonia County Sheriff's Office
 Chittenden County Sheriff's Department
 Essex County Sheriff's Office

 Franklin County Sheriff's Department
 Grand Isle County Sheriff's Office
 Lamoille County Sheriff's Department
 Orange County Sheriff's Department
 Orleans County Sheriff's Office

 Rutland County Sheriff's Office
 Washington County Sheriff's Office
 Windham County Sheriff's Department
 Windsor County Sheriff's Department

Municipal agencies 

 Barre Police Department (City of Barre)
 Barre Police Department (Town of Barre)
 Bellows Falls Police Department
 Bennington Police Department
 Berlin Police Department
 Bradford Police Department 
 Brandon Police Department
 Brattleboro Police Department
 Brighton Police Department
 Bristol Police Department
 Burlington Police Department
 Canaan Police Department
 Castleton Police Department
Chester Police Department
 Colchester Police Department
 Dover Police Department
 Essex Police Department
 Fairlee Police Department
 Fair Haven Police Department
 Hardwick Police Department
 Hartford Police Department
 Hinesburg Police Department
 Killington Police Department
 Ludlow Police Department
 Lyndonville Police Department
 Manchester Police Department (Town of Manchester)
 Middlebury Police Department
 Milton Police Department

 Morristown Police Department
 Montpelier Police Department
 Mount Tabor Police Department
 Newport Police Department (City of Newport)
 Northfield Police Department
 Norwich Police Department
 Pittsford Police Department
 Randolph Police Department
 Richmond Police Department
 Royalton Police Department
 Rutland Police Department (City of Rutland)
 Rutland Police Department (Town of Rutland)
 Shelburne Police Department
 South Burlington Police Department
 Springfield Police Department
 St. Albans Police Department (City of St. Albans)
 St. Johnsbury Police Department
 Stowe Police Department
 Swanton Police Department (Village of Swanton)
 Thetford Police Department
 Vergennes Police Department
 Weathersfield Police Department
 Williston Police Department
 Wilmington Police Department
 Windsor Police Department
 Winhall Police Department
 Winooski Police Department 
 Woodstock Police Department

College police
University of Vermont Police

References

Vermont
Law enforcement agencies of Vermont
Law enforcement agencies